Churchill's Bodyguard (2005) is a 13-episode British television documentary series chronicling Winston Churchill's bodyguard, Walter H. Thompson (voiced by Dennis Waterman), who guarded him throughout his career. The series is based on Walter Thompson's memoir, which he wrote as a British police officer who was Churchill's personal bodyguard for 18 years. The series was created by the producers of Hitler's Bodyguard, and narrated by Robert Powell.

See also 

 Hitler's Bodyguard (TV series), a 13-part documentary with the same directors and narrator

References

External links 

 

2005 British television series debuts
2005 British television series endings
2000s British documentary television series
British military television series
Documentary television series about World War II
English-language television shows